Blank Realm is a musical group from Brisbane Australia active since 2005. The group is composed of sibling members Daniel, Luke and Sarah Spencer (who are Australian born of Sri Lankan heritage) and guitarist Luke Walsh. They were described by the Guardian as having "a sound drawn from krautrock, New York’s no wave, New Zealand’s entire Flying Nun roster, and those closer to home, like the Go-Betweens." The group's music employs pop /rock song structures, but uses  elements of improvisation, particularly during live performances 

Their 2014 album Grassed Inn was shortlisted for the Australian Music Prize (AMP).

In 2015 the band's album Illegals in Heaven won best album at the Queensland Music Awards. The song "Palace of Love" was the most played track on Double J digital radio that year.

Discography

Extended plays

Awards and nominations

Australian Music Prize
The Australian Music Prize (the AMP) is an annual award of $30,000 given to an Australian band or solo artist in recognition of the merit of an album released during the year of award. The commenced in 2005.

|-
| 2014
| Grassed Inn
| Australian Music Prize
| 
|-

J Award
The J Awards are an annual series of Australian music awards that were established by the Australian Broadcasting Corporation's youth-focused radio station Triple J. They commenced in 2005.

|-
| J Awards of 2014
| themselves
| Double J Artist of the Year
| 
|-
| J Awards of 2015
| themselves
| Double J Artist of the Year
|

Queensland Music Awards
The Queensland Music Awards (previously known as Q Song Awards) are annual awards celebrating Queensland, Australia's brightest emerging artists and established legends. They commenced in 2006.
 
|-
| 2016
| Illegals in Heaven
| Album of the Year 
| 
|-

References

External links

Australian rock music groups
Musical groups from Brisbane
Siltbreeze Records artists
Fire Records (UK) artists